Columbia Asia is a  multinational chain of hospitals, and one of the largest and fastest-growing healthcare companies in Southeast Asia. Columbia Asia started its operations in 1996, with the first hospital acquired a year later in Sarawak, East Malaysia. Currently, it has 19 medical facilities across Southeast Asia: 13 in Malaysia, 3 in Vietnam, and 3 in Indonesia.

In September 2019, a joint-venture partnership between Malaysian-based conglomerate, Hong Leong Group, and alternative asset firm, TPG had acquired most of Columbia Asia assets in Southeast Asia which include Malaysia, Vietnam, and Indonesia with a total of 19 medical facilities.

Targeting the fast-growing middle-income group, Columbia Asia offers medical services by setting up mid-sized hospitals in residential areas.

The company is in the midst of expansion and upon completion of this phase, the company will have 14 facilities in Malaysia, 3 facilities in Vietnam, and 5 facilities in Indonesia. In addition to the pipeline projects, expansion of the existing facilities is also planned to cater to the growing healthcare demand in the community.

Columbia Asia medical facilities provide medical services such as General Surgery, Paediatrics, Obstetrics & Gynaecology, Orthopaedics, and Internal Medicine. These are supported by ancillary services that include an Intensive Care Unit(ICU) , Neonatal Care Unit, Physiotherapy, Laboratory, Pharmacy, and Imaging.

Current facilities

Malaysia

Columbia Asia Hospital – Klang
Serving the residents in and around Setia Alam, Bukit Raja, Bandar Baru Klang, Kapar and Pekan Meru, Columbia Asia Hospital – Klang is a multi-disciplinary hospital that offers specialized services including Cardiology, Orthopedic, General Surgery, Internal Medicine, Pediatrics, and Radiology.

Columbia Asia Hospital – Puchong 
Columbia Asia Hospital – Puchong is a private hospital in Puchong, Malaysia. It opened in 2007 and cost RM55 million to build. The facility has 78 beds, 30 resident doctors, and 15 visiting consultants and serves a population of 300,000 people, from Puchong and surrounding areas. The hospital also uses a proprietary software system for medical records, billing and queuing of patients.

Columbia Asia Hospital – Taiping 
Columbia Asia Hospital – Taiping is a private hospital in Taiping, Malaysia.

The hospital opened in 2008 and cost RM70 million to build. The 82-bed facility has three operating theatres, a medical laboratory, radiological facilities and the computerized operating systems.

Columbia Asia Hospital – Seremban
Columbia Asia Hospital – Seremban is a private hospital in Seremban, Malaysia. The hospital opened in 1999 and now has 116 beds and offers outpatient and inpatient specialist services, a 24-hour clinic, and emergency services.

Other Hospitals

 Columbia Asia Hospital – Petaling Jaya
 Columbia Asia Hospital – Miri
 Columbia Asia Hospital – Bintulu
 Columbia Asia Hospital – Bukit Rimau
 Columbia Asia Hospital – Iskandar Puteri
 Columbia Asia Hospital – Setapak
 Columbia Asia Hospital – Cheras
 Columbia Asia Extended Care Hospital – Shah Alam
 Columbia Asia Hospital – Tebrau Newest

Vietnam
 Columbia Asia – Gia Dinh International Hospital: The 20-bed facility was opened in 1998 in Ho Chi Minh City's Binh Thanh district, and was the first 100% foreign-invested hospital in the country.
 Columbia Asia International Clinic – Saigon, Ho Chi Minh City: Located in District 1.
 Columbia Asia – Binh Duong International Hospital, Thuan An: The 100-bed facility was opened in 2012 and is the first 100% foreign-invested hospital in Binh Duong province.

Indonesia

 Columbia Asia Hospital – Medan
 Columbia Asia Hospital – Pulomas, East Jakarta
 Columbia Asia Hospital – Semarang

Planned facilities

Malaysia
 Batu Kawan Penang

References

Hospital networks
Hospitals in Kuala Lumpur
Medical and health organisations based in Malaysia
Hospitals in Indonesia
Hospitals in Malaysia